Iron(II) cyanide is an inorganic compound with the empirical formula Fe(CN)2. It may have a Fe2[Fe(CN)6] structure.

Production
Iron(II) cyanide can be produced by dissolving ammonium ferrocyanide at 320 °C.

3 (NH4)4Fe(CN)6 → Fe2Fe(CN)6 + 12 NH4CN

Reaction
Iron(II) cyanide can react with potassium hydroxide solvent to produce iron(II) hydroxide and potassium ferrocyanide.

Fe2Fe(CN)6 + 4 KOH → 2 Fe(OH)2 + K4Fe(CN)6

References

Iron(II) compounds
Cyanides